Wa is a town and the capital of Wa Municipal District and the Upper West Region of northern Ghana. Wa had a 2012 settlement population of 102,446. Features of the town include several churches and  mosques, the Wa-Na Palace, the St. Andrew's Catholic cathedral, the University for Development Studies (UDS), a museum, a nearby hippopotamus sanctuary in Wicheau (located in the Wa-West district), the mushroom rock In Jirapa and the ants hill at Nanvielle. The geography of Wa is notable for the dramatic monadnock Ombo Mountain, which is located around Kaleo and visible from much of the Wa town. Other notable towns around Wa region include Naaha and Ga.

The town serves as a transportation hub for the Upper West region, with major roads leading north to Hamile, and northeast to Tumu and the Upper East Region. There is also a small airport, the Wa Airport.

History
Wa has been inhabited for several hundred years, by traders who settled in Wa to participate in the trans-Saharan trade. Wa also holds the mortal remains of Babatu, a notorious raider well known for his raids in the Upper West region during the late and early 19th century.

In 1892, G. E. Ferguson, a Fante man who had explored the Asante Empire and areas to its north on the instructions of the governor of the Gold Coast Colony, reported that the population of Wa at the time was larger than that of Accra. Ferguson had not reached Wa in his travels, but had been to some towns under the control of Gonja.

Wa was long the capital of the Kingdom of Wala.

Starting in the 1930s the Ahmadiyya began to proselytize in Wa. This led to many clashes with the Sunni Muslims in the city, especially over use of the main mosque. In 1951 rioting rose to such a level that the Wala people consider it to have been a civil war.

Violence broke out in 1978 between the Ahmadiyya and the Sunni. In 1980 there was intense fighting as leaders J. N. Momori and Yakubu Seidu both mobilized their supporters, seeking to succeed Sidiki Bomi as the Wa Na. Momori eventually in 1985 became the Wa Na with the reign name of Wa Na Momori Bondiri II.

Demographics
In 1880 it is estimated that Wa had about 8,000 people. This number is thought to have fallen to 2,000 by 1900. In 1921 the census found the population to be 2,806. The population had risen to 5,207 by 1931. In that year the Wa district of the Wala Native Authority had a population of 13,025. In 1948 Wa had a population of 5,128 while the district had 15,827 people. In 1960 the population was 14,406. In 1970 the population had risen to 21,393.

In 1984 Wa had a population of 36,000.

In the 1880s Wa was said to have a population that was entirely Muslim. The Ahmadiyya began gaining converts here in the 1930s. Recent estimates place the overall population of the Roman Catholic Diocese of Wa as about 5% Catholic, but how much this is in Wa and how much in other areas under the diocese is not clear. The Church of Jesus Christ of Latter-day Saints established a branch in Wa in mid-2017, making it so that every region in Ghana had at least one official congregation of the Church.

Transportation

There are Public Transports from Wa to major cities such as Accra; Kumasi, Mim, Ahafo ; Cape Coast, Sunyani; Tamale; Tema; Ho; Bolgatanga; Elubo; Aflao, Techiman.

Environment and weather
Wa is in the southern part of the Sahel, the semi-arid area south of the Sahara. Following the May–October rainy season is a cool dry period called the Harmattan when a steady, often dusty, north wind blows from the Sahara. The hottest period of the year is in February and March when daytime temperatures often reach 40 °C (103 °F).

Economy and agriculture
Despite its urban status, Wa is in many ways still an agricultural community, and the majority of the Wa population make a good portion of their living in small scale farming. The main crops are corn, millet, yams, okra and groundnuts. Upland rice is also farmed in a few areas of Wa. The major fruit crop is the mango. Shea nuts are collected from wild trees for food or refinement into oils and cosmetics.

Education
The Town of Wa is host to a few renowned educational institutions. The biggest Senior High School in the Upper West Region, Wa Senior High School (formerly, WASSEC), is in this town. WASSEC had some tumultuous times in the past due to mismanagement and indiscipline which decreased the school's standards. However, the school has recently been recording major improvements in students' general discipline and performance in the West African Senior Secondary School Certificate Examination. The school was made a model school, which has boosted its infrastructural capacity, thereby making it an attractive destination for students and teachers. Wa also has St. Francis Xavier Junior Seminary. Built in the 1960s, Xavier has produced a plethora of successful young men for the service of the country and the world. St. Francis Xavier Junior Seminary, arguably the best secondary school in the country, has consistently excelled in the Senior Secondary School Certificate Exams(SSSCE). The University for Development Studies (UDS) is a major University in Ghana and Wa is host to one of its campuses equipped with three faculties, namely:

 Integrated Development Studies
 Planning and Land Management
 Education, Law and Business Studies

Schools in Wa 
 Islamic Senior High School
 Jamiat Al-Hidayyat Al-Islamiat Girls Senior High School
 Northern Star Senior High School
 St. Francis Xavier Minor Seminary
 Wa Senior High School
 Wa Senior High Technical School
 Wa Technical Institute
 T. I. Ahmadiyya Senior High School
 Nusrat Jahan College of Education
 Nursing Training college, Wa
 Wa Technical University (formally Wa Polytechnic)
 S.D Dombo University of Business and Integrated Development Studies, SDD-UBIDS (formally Wa Campus of UDS)

Culture

The Damba Festival
The Damba festival was the main traditional event of Wa. It was typically held in late September to correspond with a harvest in Wa. The highlight of the year was a ceremony in which the Wa-na stepped over a small cow lying on the ground. According to traditional belief, if any part of the Wa-na or the Wa-na clothing touched the cow, the Wa-na would probably die within the year.  If on the other hand, the Wa-na stepped over the cow successfully, the Wa-na was guaranteed a successful coming year.

Food and cuisine
The staple food of Wa is known as sao or Tuo Zaafi in the local dialect, which is often abbreviated TZ or T-Zed in English. Tuo Zaafi means "very hot tuo" in Hausa. It is a thick porridge of corn flour eaten by tearing off a chunk and dipping into a soup, usually of okra.

Other foods common to the Waala People are Kapala(a widely consumed food in Ghana, more commonly known as Fufu), Kuon-tulu (literally translated as "hot water" in Waale, a breakfast food commonly known as Kooko or Hausa Kooko) and Kpogulo (beans powder made into paste, wrapped in Cocoyam or Taro leaves and served with a side of tomato stew).

References

External links

 Ghana-pedia webpage – Wa
 Wa, Ghana oriented website
 A news report on the passing of the Wa-na

 
Regional capitals in Ghana
Populated places in the Upper West Region